The 1953 Coronation Honours were awarded in honour of the Coronation of Elizabeth II.

Privy Council

 The Honourable Harold Edward Holt, Minister for Labour and National Service and Minister for Immigration. Commonwealth of Australia.
 The Honourable John McEwen, Minister for Commerce and Agriculture, Commonwealth of Australia.

Knight Bachelor

 The Honourable Shirley Williams Jeffries, of the State of South Australia. For public services.
 The Honourable Geoffrey Sandford Reed, Judge of the Supreme Court, State of South Australia.
 Eric Ernest Von Bibra, Esq., AgentGeneral in London for the State of Tasmania.
 Corporal Raymond Douglas Huish, of Queensland, Australia, president of the Queensland Branch of the Returned Services League.

Most Distinguished Order of St Michael and St George

Companion of the Order of St Michael and St George (CMG)
 Brigadier Thomas Charles Eastick, President of the South Australian Branch of the Returned Sailors', Soldiers' and Airmen's League.

Most Excellent Order of the British Empire

Commander of the Order of the British Empire (CBE)
 Maxwell Gordon Butcher, Esq., For public services in the State of Tasmania.
 Gilbert Brown, Esq., of the State of South Australia. For services in the development of Anaesthetics.
 Richard Henry Maclure Lea, Esq., General Manager of the Electricity Trust, State of South Australia.
 Charles Kingsley Murphy, Esq., Clerk of the House of Assembly, and Librarian to Parliament, State of Tasmania.

Officer of the Order of the British Empire (OBE)
 Ann Frances Ellen, Mrs. Adams, Matron, Lachlan Park Mental Hospital, State of Tasmania.
 John Bishop, Esq., Elder Professor of Music 'at the University of Adelaide, State of South Australia.
 William Charles Morris, Esq., formerly Headmaster of the Launceston High School, State of Tasmania
 Miss Mary Stuart Douglas, President of the Ex-Servicewomen's Association, and State Commissioner for Girl Guides, State of South Australia.
 Miss Gladys Ruth Gibson, Inspector, Education Department, and President of the National Council of Women, State of South Australia.
 Rex Whaddon Parsons, Esq., Principal, School of Mines and Industries, State of South Australia.
 William Wilson, Esq., J.P., Council Clerk of the Lilydale Municipality, and formerly Secretary of the Municipal Association, State of Tasmania.

Member of the Order of the British Empire (MBE)
 George Patten Adams, Esq., of Westbury, State of Tasmania. For services to philanthropic and charitable movements.
 Frank Robert Dowse, Esq., Superintendent of Reserves, Launceston City Council, State of Tasmania.
 Miss Katherine Isabel Kewley, Matron of the Lady Victoria Buxton Girls' Club, State of South Australia.
 Mary Evangelist, Mrs. Lamp, of Launceston, State of Tasmania. For social welfare services.
 Miss Mary Julia Lawes. For services to the Red Cross in the State of South Australia.
 Ida Josephine Isabell, Mrs. Norton. For social welfare services, especially to the Royal Hobart Hospital, State of Tasmania.
 Albert Baden Thompson, Esq., a prominent Trade Unionist, and a member of the Board of Management of the State Bank, in the State of South Australia.
 Benjamin Watkins, Esq. For public and philanthropic services in the State of Tasmania.
 Cecil Hobart Webster, Esq. For services to patriotic and philanthropic organisations in the State of Tasmania.

Imperial Service Order

Companion of the Imperial Service Order (ISO)
 Harold Bruce Bennett, Esq., Director of Industrial Development, State of Tasmania.
 William Richard Penhall, Esq., Secretary, Aborigines Protection Board, State of South Australia.

British Empire Medal (BEM)

 Walter Muggleton, Messenger, Department of the Premier, State of South Australia.

Royal Red Cross

Member of the Royal Red Cross (RRC)
 Wing Commander George Hubert Newbourne Shiells, (033077), Royal Australian Air Force.

References

1953 awards
Orders, decorations, and medals of Australia